Volmar is a given name and a surname of Germanic origin, and may refer to:

 Volmar (monk), 12th century monk
 King Volmar, a dwarf king from German mythology
 Doug Volmar (born 1945), American ice hockey player
 Isaak Volmar, Baron, lawyer, aide in the Holy Roman Empire delegation at Münster which negotiated the 1648 Peace of Westphalia
 Joseph Simon Volmar, Swiss painter
 Volmar Wikström, Finnish wrestler

See also
Vollmar
Vollmer